Lord Lift Us Up is the debut album released by brother and sister duo BeBe & CeCe Winans, released in 1984.

Track listing

Personnel 
 CeCe Winans – lead and backing vocals
 BeBe Winans – lead and backing vocals, keyboards, vocal arrangements 
 Michael Ruff – keyboards
 Hadley Hockersmith – guitars 
 Dean Parks – guitars
 Abraham Laboriel – bass
 Bill Maxwell – drums (1, 2, 3, 5-8, 10), percussion, vocal arrangements 
 Alex Acuña – drums (4, 9), percussion
 Justo Almario – saxophones
 Andy Martin – trombone
 Scott Smith – trumpet, musical arrangements 
 Charles Veal – string concertmaster
 Michael Morgan – backing vocals
 Ron Smith – backing vocals 
 Daniel Winans – backing vocals, lead vocals (5)
 Marvin Winans – backing vocals, vocal arrangements 
 Vickie Winans – backing vocals
 Marvie Wright – backing vocals

Production 
 Bill Maxwell – producer 
 Eric AuCoin – executive producer 
 Christopher Banninger – engineer 
 Win Kutz – engineer 
 Bob Whyley – engineer 
 Bernie Grundman – mastering 

1984 debut albums
BeBe & CeCe Winans albums